Kregor Hermet (born 9 June 1997) is an Estonian professional basketball player for Kalev/Cramo. He is a 2.05 m (6 ft 8 in) tall power forward and center. Hermet represents the Estonian national basketball team internationally.

Professional career
Hermet began playing basketball with Audentes.

On 1 September 2016, Hermet signed with Força Lleida. On 24 April 2017, he signed a three-year extension. In July 2020 he signed with Kalev/Cramo.

On June 13, 2022, he signed with Start Lublin of the PLK.

In January 2023 Hermet went back to Kalev/Cramo and signed a 1 and a half year deal.

Estonian national team
Hermet made his debut for the senior Estonian national team in the 2019 FIBA Basketball World Cup pre-qualifiers.

Career statistics

Domestic leagues

Estonia national team

|-
| style="text-align:left;"| 2013
| style="text-align:left;"| 2013 FIBA Europe Under-16 Championship Division B
| style="text-align:left;"| Estonia U-16
| 9 ||  || 19.5 || .457 || .500 || .400 || 3.4 || .7 || .9 || .0 || 5.2
|-
| style="text-align:left;"| 2015
| style="text-align:left;"| 2015 FIBA Europe Under-18 Championship Division B
| style="text-align:left;"| Estonia U-18
| 9 ||  || 15.2 || .521 || .111 || .500 || 4.2 || .3 || .3 || .3 || 6.0
|-
| style="text-align:left;"| 2016
| style="text-align:left;"| 2016 FIBA Europe Under-20 Championship Division B
| style="text-align:left;"| Estonia U-20
| 6 ||  || 21.1 || .424 || .417 || .842 || 4.8 || .5 || 1.2 || 1.3 || 11.8
|-
| style="text-align:left;"| 2017
| style="text-align:left;"| 2019 Basketball World Cup Pre-Qualifiers
| style="text-align:left;"| Estonia
| 3 ||  || 6.2 || .833 || .500 || - || 1.0 || .0 || .0 || .0 || 3.7
|-
| style="text-align:left;"| 2018–19
| style="text-align:left;"| 2019 Basketball World Cup Qualification
| style="text-align:left;"| Estonia
| 6 ||  || 4.2 || .833 || 1.000 || 1.000 || .2 || .2 || .3 || .0 || 2.5
|-
| style="text-align:left;"| 2020
| style="text-align:left;"| EuroBasket 2022 qualification
| style="text-align:left;"| Estonia
| 2 ||   || 12.5 || .417 || .000 || - || 1.5 || .5 || .0 || .5 || 5.0

References

External links
 Kregor Hermet at basket.ee 
 Kregor Hermet at fiba.com

1997 births
Living people
BC Kalev/Cramo players
Centers (basketball)
Estonian expatriate basketball people in Spain
Estonian men's basketball players
Força Lleida CE players
Korvpalli Meistriliiga players
Power forwards (basketball)
Basketball players from Tallinn
Start Lublin players
University of Tartu basketball team players
Estonian expatriate basketball people in Poland